Elkton is a city in Giles County, Tennessee, United States. The population was 578 at the 2010 census.

Geography
Most of the city is on the north bank of the Elk River, a southwest-flowing tributary of the Tennessee River.

U.S. Route 31 passes through the west side of the city, leading northwest  to Pulaski, the Giles County seat, and south  to Ardmore at the Alabama border. Interstate 65 passes just east of Elkton, with access from Exit 1 (US 31) south of town and from Exit 6 (State Route 273) at the north end of the city limits. I-65 leads north  to Nashville and south  to Birmingham, Alabama.

Demographics

As of the census of 2000, there were 510 people, 203 households, and 142 families residing in the city. The population density was 340.6 people per square mile (131.3/km2). There were 226 housing units at an average density of 150.9 per square mile (58.2/km2). The racial makeup of the city was 64.51% White, 35.10% African American and 0.39% Native American.

There were 203 households, out of which 26.1% had children under the age of 18 living with them, 50.2% were married couples living together, 14.8% had a female householder with no husband present, and 29.6% were non-families. 26.1% of all households were made up of individuals, and 10.3% had someone living alone who was 65 years of age or older. The average household size was 2.51 and the average family size was 3.01.

In the city, the population was spread out, with 22.0% under the age of 18, 9.0% from 18 to 24, 28.2% from 25 to 44, 27.6% from 45 to 64, and 13.1% who were 65 years of age or older. The median age was 40 years. For every 100 females, there were 100.0 males. For every 100 females age 18 and over, there were 87.7 males.

The median income for a household in the city was $28,281, and the median income for a family was $36,250. Males had a median income of $21,953 versus $21,583 for females. The per capita income for the city was $12,993. About 12.5% of families and 18.3% of the population were below the poverty line, including 26.4% of those under age 18 and 8.4% of those age 65 or over.

References

External links

City of Elkton official website
City charter

Cities in Tennessee
Cities in Giles County, Tennessee